Stuart Island is one of the San Juan Islands, north of San Juan Island and west of Waldron Island in the U.S. state of Washington. The  island is home to two communities of full and part-time residents, a state park, a one-room schoolhouse, and two airstrips (Stuart Island Airstrip - 7WA5 with a  grass runway, and Stuart Island West - 2WA3 with a  dirt runway).

Facilities
Two sites, both part of Stuart Island State Park, are on public lands.  One is located near the center of the island, and another is on the western coast, the site of the Turn Point Light Station, a lighthouse guiding shipping in the busy waters of Boundary Pass to the island's north.  Turn Point Light Station is on land administered by the Bureau of Land Management's Spokane District, Wenatchee Resource Area, Lopez Island Office.

The lighthouse and nearby "Lover's Leap" are popular hiking destinations accessible by county road. Sheltered anchorages for boaters can be found in Reid Harbor and Prevost Harbor, with public state park facilities in each.

There are no stores or other public commercial establishments on the island, aside from a wooden box, stocked by a local family with printed T-shirts and other souvenir items; each souvenir comes with an envelope through which visitors return payment by mail, based on an honor system. The local schoolhouse closed in fall of 2007 due to lack of students, but reopened in 2008 with two students.

Satellite Island, which lies in Prevost Harbor on the northeast side of the island, is used by YMCA Camp Orkila as a basecamp for teen expeditions and for field trips by campers. Nearby Prevost Island in British Columbia is also named after Prevost, while Satellite Island is named after his ship.

History
Stuart Island was named by Charles Wilkes during the Wilkes Expedition of 1838–42, to honor Frederick D. Stuart, the captain's clerk of the expedition.

See also

References

External links

San Juan Islands